The Darmandville bow-fingered gecko (Cyrtodactylus darmandvillei) is a species of lizard in the family Gekkonidae. The species is endemic to Indonesia.

Etymology
The specific name, darmandvillei, is in honor of Jesuit Missionary Father Cornelis J. F. le Coq d'Armandville (1846–1896).

Geographic range
C. darmandvillei is found on the Indonesian islands of Flores, Komodo, Lombok, Pulau Kalao, and Sumbawa.

Habitat

Description

Behavior
C. darmandvillei is both terrestrial and arboreal.

Reproduction
C. darmandvillei is oviparous.

References

Further reading
Mecke S, Kieckbusch M, Hartmann L, Kaiser H (2016). "Historical considerations and comments on the type series of Cyrtodactylus marmoratus Gray, 1831, with an updated comparative table for the bent-toed geckos of the Sunda Islands and Sulawesi". Zootaxa 4175 (4): 353–365.
Rösler H (2000). "Kommentierte Liste der rezent, subrezent und fossil bekannten Geckotaxa (Reptilia: Gekkonomorpha)". Gekkota 2: 28–153. (Cyrtodactylus darmandvillei, p. 65). (in German).
Weber M (1890). "Reptilia from the Malay Archipelago. 1. Sauria, Crocodilidae, Chelonia". pp. 158–177. (in English). In: Weber M (1890). Zoologische Ergebnisse einer Reise in Niederländische Ost-Indien, Erster Band [Volume I]. Leiden: E.J. Brill. xi + 460 pp. + Plates I–XXV. (in German, English, and Latin). (Gymnodactylus d'armandvillei, new species, pp. 163–164 + Plate XIV, figure 1).

Cyrtodactylus
Reptiles described in 1890
Taxa named by Max Carl Wilhelm Weber